The Kolster Radio Corporation was an electronics manufacturer and distributor based in Newark, New Jersey, which went bankrupt in January 1930.  It bore the name of its chief research engineer, Frederick A. Kolster. In June 1928, the Columbia Phonograph Company announced plans to market a radio receiving set built by Kolster Radio. The product was sold in the United States, Europe, and Japan.

Insolvency

Three receivers were appointed on January 21, 1930, to handle the failure of the company, which was located at 200 Mount Prospect Avenue in Newark.
The business possessed considerably more assets than liabilities. However, because of overproduction, it suffered an inability to raise cash to fulfill its immediate obligations.

Under a plan approved by receivers, the Kolster plant in Newark reopened after March 1930. The production facility fulfilled the completion of 15,000 partly built radio sets. These were sold to Kolster distributors for US$500,000.

References

Electronics companies of the United States
Manufacturing companies based in Newark, New Jersey
Electronics companies disestablished in 1930
1930 disestablishments in New Jersey
Defunct manufacturing companies based in New Jersey